Coralie Clément (born Coralie Biolay; 1 September 1978 in Villefranche-sur-Saône, Rhône) is a French singer.

Biography
Clément was born into a family of musicians, her father a clarinetist, and studied the violin from the age of six but later quit. Her brother, Benjamin Biolay, also a singer, has written for Henri Salvador and wrote for and produced her own debut, as well as its follow-up. Among her claimed inspirations are Serge Gainsbourg, Françoise Hardy, Jane Birkin. She recorded her first album while studying history at university.

Clément sang the song "Dorénavant," used as the theme of the film L'Idole by Samantha Lang, starring Leelee Sobieski. A song from her first album was used in the soundtrack of the movie Something's Gotta Give starring Diane Keaton and Jack Nicholson.

In 2001, she released her first album, Salle des Pas Perdus. This album is a collaborative effort between her and her brother, Benjamin Biolay, who wrote and arranged 10 of the 12 songs. Her second album, Bye bye beauté, was released in 2005 and features songs that are more pop and rock oriented than those of Salle des Pas Perdus, and was also produced by her brother.

Discography
 Salle des pas perdus (2001)
 Bye bye beauté (2005)
 Toystore (2008)
 Iris a 3 ans (2013). Audio book for children, released under her birth name with designer Gesa Hansen
 La belle Affaire (2014)

References

External links
 Interview with Coralie by Dusty Wright at CultureCatch.com
 Trouser Press entry

1978 births
Living people
People from Villefranche-sur-Saône
21st-century French singers
21st-century French women singers